Bradford is a town in western Sierra Leone located near the capital of Sierra Leone, Freetown.

Transport 

The city was formerly served by a railway station on the Sierra Leone Government Railway.

See also 

 Railway stations in Sierra Leone

References 

Populated places in Sierra Leone